Heman Dass (Urdu: ہیمان داس) is a Pakistani Politician and a Member of Senate of Pakistan.

Political career
He belongs to Baluchistan Province. In March 2012 he was elected to the Senate of Pakistan on reserved seat for minority as Jameet Ulema Islam (F) candidate. He is a member of Senate committee of National Health Services, Regulations and Coordination, Federal Education and Professional Training, Planning Development and Reform and Functional Committee on Human Rights.

See also
 List of Senators of Pakistan
 Ayatullah Durrani
 Hafiz Hamdullah
 Hinduism in Pakistan

References

Living people
Jamiat Ulema-e-Islam (F) politicians
Members of the Senate of Pakistan
Pakistani Hindus
Year of birth missing (living people)